The Conservatory of music in Llíria (Valencia) is a public music school, depending administratively on the Conservatory number 2 in Valencia.  
The conservatory offers the following subjects: clarinet, bassoon, flute, hautbois, saxophone, French horn, trombone, trumpet, tuba, double bass, viola, violin, violoncello, percussion, piano and guitar. There are also music ensembles to complete the students educational program: orchestra, wind ensemble, big band and a choir.

History
Lliria is called the city of music and is known for having a very old musical tradition. There are two Wind orchestras Banda Primitiva of Llíria and Unión Musical and the city council decided in the 90's to create a music school in order to give proper musical education.

References

External links
 Official Web Conservatory of Lliria

Municipalities in Camp de Túria
Populated places in Camp de Túria
Music schools in Spain